The Criminal Law Consolidation Acts 1861 (24 & 25 Vict. cc. 94 – 100) were Acts of the Parliament of the United Kingdom. They consolidated provisions from a large number of earlier statutes which were then repealed. Their purpose was to simplify the criminal law. There were six consolidation Acts and a further Act which effected consequential repeals.

They are essentially revised versions of an earlier set of consolidation Acts, commonly known as Peel's Acts, incorporating subsequent statutes.

They were drafted by Charles Sprengel Greaves.

List of the Acts
Accessories and Abettors Act 1861 c. 94 
Criminal Statutes Repeal Act 1861 c. 95
Larceny Act 1861 c. 96 
Malicious Damage Act 1861 c. 97
Forgery Act 1861 c. 98
Coinage Offences Act 1861 c. 99 
Offences Against the Person Act 1861 c. 100

Of these statutes, the Criminal Statutes Repeal Act, the Larceny Act and the Coinage Offences Act have been repealed in England and Wales. The majority of the provisions of Accessories and Abettors Act, the Malicious Damage Act and the Forgery Act have been repealed and the last two have been practically superseded by codification Acts. However, the bulk of the Offences Against the Person Act remains in force.

Interpretation

Internal evidence of meaning by comparison of enactments

In his commentary on these Acts, their draftsman said:

This passage was cited and approved by Lord Steyn in R v. Burstow, R v. Ireland [1998] 1 Cr App Rep 177, [1997] 3 WLR 534, [1998] AC 147, [1997] UKHL 34, [1997] 4 All ER 225, (24 July 1997) (this case related to the significance of the appearance of "cause" and "inflict" respectively in sections 18 and 20 of the Offences against the Person Act 1861).

Common features

Short titles

None of these Acts was originally provided with a short title. The short titles were conferred by the Short Titles Act 1896.

Passage through Parliament
Hansard (House of Lords), 17 April 1860, vol.157, col. 1873 (nomination of select committee)
Hansard (House of Lords), 7 May 1860, vol.158, col. 747 (report of select committee)
Hansard (House of Lords), 10 May 1860, vol.158, col. 999 - 1001 (committee)

Derivative legislation
The Canadian criminal law consolidation Acts of 1869 were based on the criminal law consolidation Acts 1861, and taken almost textually from them.

The Tasmanian Acts 27 Vict. Nos. 5 - 10 were framed from the Imperial Acts 24 & 25 Vict c 94 and cc 96 - 100.

References
Charles Sprengel Greaves, The Criminal Law Consolidation and Amendment Acts. Second Edition. V R Stevens, Sons, Haynes, H Sweet and W Maxwell. London. 1862. 
James Edward Davis. The Criminal Law Consolidation Statutes of the 24 & 25 of Victoria, Chapters 94 to 100: Edited with Notes, Critical and Explanatory. Butterworths. 1861. Digitized copy from Google Books.
T W Saunders and Edward W Cox. The Criminal Law Consolidation Acts, 1861. First Edition. John Crockford. London. 1861.  Second Edition. 1862. 
John Frederick Archbold. The Consolidated Criminal Statutes of England and Ireland. Simpkin, Marshall & Co. London. Hodges & Smith. Dublin. Bell & Bradfute. Edinburgh. 1861. Google Books.
James Bigg. Criminal Law Consolidation: The Public General Acts consolidating the Criminal Law of England and Ireland. Second Edition. Waterlow and Sons. Vacher and Sons. P S King. Westminster. 1868. Google Books.

English criminal law
United Kingdom Acts of Parliament 1861
1861 in British law